Lubcha Castle was a residential castle of the Radziwill family on the left bank of the Neman River at Lubcha near Navahradak, Belarus.

The castle began its life in 1581 as a fortified residence of Jan Kiszka, a powerful Calvinist magnate. It had timber walls, a single stone tower, and was surrounded by moats on three sides, the fourth side protected by the river.

Lubcha later passed to Janusz Radziwiłł, Great Hetman of Lithuania, who expanded the castle by adding three stone towers. In 1655 it was taken and devastated by the rebellious Cossacks under Ivan Zolotarenko.

Only the barbican and one other tower were left standing after the Cossack incursion. The deserted estate changed owners several times, remaining untenanted until the mid-19th century, when a Gothic Revival palace was built on the grounds. 

The Lubcha estate suffered much damage during both world wars. The palace was reduced to a shell in 1914 and was remodeled into a school building by the Soviets in 1947. In the early 21st century, some of the castle walls were rebuilt by a team of volunteers.

Online references 
 Lyubchа Castle at globus.tut.by
 History and Restoration of Lyubcha Castle

Buildings and structures in Grodno Region
Castles in Belarus
Castles and palaces of the Radziwiłł family
Navahrudak District